Lee Ryol-li (born on May 20, 1982), or Retsuri Lee, is a Japanese-born North Korean retired professional boxer. He was born in Kadoma, Osaka, and lives in Yokohama, Kanagawa.

Biography
Lee won his first fight by third-round KO in 2005. He won the Japanese featherweight title in 2010, and defended the title once before fighting for a world title.

He captured the WBA super bantamweight title against Thai Poonsawat Kratingdaenggym on October 2, 2010 at Korakuen Hall, Tokyo, Japan. He earned a 5 million yen bonus for the fight.

Lee is also affiliated with Chongryon, or the General Association of Korean Residents in Japan, a group of ethnic Koreans in Japan that is sympathetic to North Korea.

See also 
List of WBA world champions
List of super bantamweight boxing champions

References

External links
Official website 
Official blog

1982 births
Living people
People from Kadoma, Osaka
People from Yokohama
Sportspeople from Kanagawa Prefecture
Sportspeople from Osaka Prefecture
Super-bantamweight boxers
World Boxing Association champions
World super-bantamweight boxing champions
World boxing champions
Zainichi Korean people
North Korean male boxers
Japanese male boxers